Castle Dome, or Castle Dome Peak is a prominent butte and high point of the Castle Dome Mountains northeast of Yuma, Arizona, in the northwestern Sonoran Desert.

It is located above and east of US Route 95 and the Castle Dome mining district. Castle Dome is noteworthy for its recreational use for day hiking. It is also often coated in winter or spring snowstorms as a white landform, with its loss of white being determined by season and duration of storm temperatures.

Mining and minerals
Some noteworthy minerals from the Castle Dome Mountains region are vanadinite, wulfenite, baryte, and fluorite.

Trails and unimproved road trails
Some of the local trails are: King Valley Road, McPherson Pass Trail, Big Eye Wash Trail, Castle Dome Mountains, and Kofa Queen Canyon Trail.

See also
 Castle Dome Landing, Arizona
 Castle Dome Mountains

References

External links
 Castle Dome: Peak-(close-up Photo), Plants and Animals, Old Collecting Reports
 Castle Dome Peak at SummitPost.org

Buttes of Arizona
Yuma Desert
Landforms of Yuma County, Arizona
Lower Colorado River Valley
Tourist attractions in Yuma County, Arizona